Corn Brook is an unincorporated community in Columbus Township, Bartholomew County, in the U.S. state of Indiana.

Geography

References

Unincorporated communities in Bartholomew County, Indiana
Unincorporated communities in Indiana